= Lynn E. Dickey =

Wyoming politician

Member of the Wyoming House of Representatives from the Sheridan district
- In office 1983–1990

Lynn E. Dickey is an American politician. She was elected to represent the Sheridan district in the Wyoming House of Representatives from 1983 to 1990.
